Masakane Yonekura (7 October 1934 – 26 August 2014) was a Japanese stage director, actor, author and illustrator who was one of the central members of the Gekidan Mingei theatre company.

Death
On 26 August 2014, Yonekura died of an abdominal aortic aneurysm rupture. He was 80.

Filmography
Brave Records of the Sanada Clan (1963) as Nezu Jinpachi
Zatoichi Meets Yojimbo (1970)
Kanashimi no Belladonna (1973)
Aitsu ni Koishite (1987)
Hope and Pain (1988)
Gakkō no Kaidan 2 (1996)
Always Sanchōme no Yūhi '64 (2012) as Rintarō Chagawa
The Little House (2014)

Television
Kunitori Monogatari (1973) as Takenaka Hanbei
Katsu Kaishū (1974) as Sakuma Shōzan
Kaze to Kumo to Niji to (1976) as Ōkiyō
Shiroi Kyotō (1978) as Noboru Kikukawa
Haru no Hatō (1985) as Itagaki Taisuke
Hideyoshi (1996) as Imagawa Yoshimoto
Saka no Ue no Kumo (2009–11) as Ōyama Iwao

References

External links

 ヨネクラマサカネドットコム

1930s births
2014 deaths
Japanese male film actors
Japanese male television actors
20th-century Japanese male actors
Japanese male stage actors